Thomas Scott Fiske (1865–January 10, 1944) was an American mathematician.

He was born in New York City  and graduated in 1885 (Ph.D., 1888) from Columbia University, where he was a fellow, assistant, tutor, instructor, and adjunct professor until 1897, when he became professor of mathematics.  In 1899 he was acting dean of Barnard College.  He was president in 1902–04 of the American Mathematical Society, and he also edited the Bulletin (1891–99) and Transactions (1899–1905) of this society.  In 1902 he became secretary of the College Entrance Examination Board.  In 1905–06 he also served as president of the Association of Teachers of Mathematics of the Middle States and Maryland.  Besides his mathematical papers, he was author of Theory of Functions of a Complex Variable (1906; fourth edition, 1907)

Writings 
 	Functions of a complex variable (New York: J. Wiley, 1907)

References

External links
 Thomas Fiske Collection at the Harry Ransom Center at the University of Texas at Austin
 
 

1865 births
1944 deaths
Scientists from New York City
19th-century American mathematicians
20th-century American mathematicians
Columbia College (New York) alumni
American non-fiction writers
American male journalists
Journalists from New York City
Presidents of the American Mathematical Society
19th-century American male writers
Mathematicians from New York (state)